William Dyke is an American politician.

William Dyke may also refer to:

William Dyke (aviator), English World War I flying ace
William Dyke (baseball), (1906–1984), American baseball player
Sir William Hart Dyke, 7th Baronet (1837–1931), English Conservative politician and tennis pioneer

See also
William Dykes (disambiguation)